The Decatur Tribune is an independent, locally-owned weekly newspaper in Decatur, Illinois, USA, covering local news, sports, business, politics and community events in Decatur and Macon County.

History
In December, 1969, Paul Osborne purchased the newspaper from Dr. V.W. Powell who had founded it one year earlier. It is a member of the Illinois Press Association and the Southern Illinois Editorial Association. The newspaper is a subscription publication, published once a week on Wednesday and distributed through the USPS and online.

Featured articles

City Beat
Editor Paul Osborne’s weekly article “City Beat” covers issues affecting his readers.  He served as Mayor of the City of Decatur from 2003-2008, and is a weekly featured guest of radio station WSOY’s “City Hall Insider”.

Scrapbook
Weekly “Scrapbook” articles tell the stories of a historical nature taking place in or about the Decatur area.

Sports
For 45 years, J. Thomas McNamara wrote a weekly sports column in the Decatur Tribune titled “Irish Stew”, covering Central Illinois high school sports.  In 2015 he received the Illinois High School Association distinguished media service award. McNamara was a member of the Illinois Basketball Coaches Hall of Fame, Macon County Sports Historian and an author of five books on local sports.  He is credited with being the drive behind the establishment of the Decatur School District’s Sports Hall of Fame.

References

Sources
 Illinois Press Association, Illinois Newspaper Directory
 United States Newspaper Listing,

External links

Decatur, Illinois
Newspapers published in Illinois
Weekly newspapers published in the United States
Publications established in 1968
Companies based in Macon County, Illinois
1968 establishments in Illinois